Xipamide is a sulfonamide diuretic drug marketed by Eli Lilly under the trade names Aquaphor (in Germany) and Aquaphoril (in Austria). It is used for the treatment of oedema and hypertension.

Mechanism of action 
Like the structurally related thiazide diuretics, xipamide acts on the kidneys to reduce sodium reabsorption in the distal convoluted tubule. This increases the osmolarity in the lumen, causing less water to be reabsorbed by the collecting ducts. This leads to increased urinary output. Unlike the thiazides, xipamide reaches its target from the peritubular side (blood side).

Additionally, it increases the secretion of potassium in the distal tubule and collecting ducts. In high doses it also inhibits the enzyme carbonic anhydrase which leads to increased secretion of bicarbonate and alkalizes the urine.

Unlike with thiazides, only terminal kidney failure renders xipamide ineffective.

Uses 
Xipamide is used for
cardiac oedema caused by decompensation of heart failure
renal oedema, chronic renal disease (but not with anuria)
hepatic oedema caused by cirrhosis
ascites
lymphoedema
hypertension in combination with chronic renal disease

Pharmacokinetics 
After oral administration, 20 mg of xipamide are resorbed quickly and reach the peak plasma concentration of 3 mg/L within an hour. The diuretic effect starts about an hour after administration, reaches its peak between the third and sixth hour, and lasts for nearly 24 hours.

One third of the dose is glucuronidized, the rest is excreted directly through the kidney (1/3) and the faeces (2/3). The total plasma clearance is 30-40 mL/min. Xipamide can be filtrated by haemodialysis but not by peritoneal dialysis.

Dosage 
Initially 40 mg, it can be reduced to 10–20 mg to prevent a relapse.

The lowest effective dose is 5 mg. More than 60 mg have no additional effects.

Adverse effects 
more than 1/10 of all patients
hypokalaemia, which can lead to nausea, muscular weakness or cramps, and ECG abnormities
1/100 to 1/10
hyponatraemia, which can lead to headache, nausea, drowsiness or confusion
orthostatic hypotension
initially increase of urea, uric acid and creatinine, which can lead to a gout attack in predisposed patients
1/1000 to 1/10,000
allergic reactions of the skin
hyperlipidaemia
less than 1/10,000
haemorrhagic pancreatitis
 acute interstitial nephritis
thrombocytopenia, leucopenia

Contraindications 
anuria
praecoma and coma hepaticum
hypovolemia, hyponatremia, hypokalemia
hypercalcemia
gout
sulfonamide hypersensitivity
pregnancy, lactation period

Interactions

Not recommended combinations
Xipamide lowers the renal clearance of lithium which can lead to lithium intoxication. (This interaction is classified as medium.)

Combinations requiring special precautions
The product information requests special precautions for these combinations:
The antihypertensive effect can be increased by ACE inhibitors, barbiturates, phenothiazines, tricyclic antidepressants, alcohol, etc. (Classified as minor.)
NSAIDs can reduce the antihypertensive and diuretic effects. Xipamide increases the neurotoxicity of high doses of salicylates. (Classified as minor.)
Toxicity of cardiac glycosides is increased due to hypokalemia and hypomagnesemia.(Classified as minor.)
Antiarrhythmic agents (classes Ia and III), phenothiazines and other antipsychotics increase the risk of torsades de pointes due to hypokalemia.

Interactions not included in the product information
Xipamide can reduce the effect of antidiabetics. (Classified as minor.)

Banned use in sport 
On 17 July 2012, cyclist Fränk Schleck was removed from the Tour de France by his team RadioShack-Nissan after his A-sample returned traces of xipamide.

References 

Diuretics
Carbonic anhydrase inhibitors
Eli Lilly and Company brands
Chloroarenes
Salicylanilides
Sulfonamides